Kuri Hayati (also Romanized as Kūrī Ḩayātī and Kūrīḩayātī) is a village in Kuri Rural District of the Central District of Jam County, Bushehr province, Iran. At the 2006 census, its population was 765 in 164 households. The following census in 2011 counted 860 people in 230 households. The latest census in 2016 showed a population of 1,136 people in 331 households; it was the largest village in its rural district.

References 

Populated places in Jam County